Stepan Pobodailo (Ukrainian: Степан Пободайло; died 1654) was a Ukrainian Cossack leader.

In 1646 he began the reconstruction of the Trinity–Saint Elijah's Monastery in Chernihiv.

He was in the service of Adam Kisiel until 1648, then went to Bohdan Khmelnytsky and was active in the Khmelnytsky Uprising.  In 1649, he was defeated at the Battle of Loyew while trying to aid Mykhailo Krychevsky. He took part in negotiations with Moscow in Pereiaslav in 1654.

References 

Zaporozhian Cossacks
1654 deaths
Year of birth unknown